Watershoot Bay is a bay on the southernmost tip of the Isle of Wight, England. It lies to the west of St. Catherine's Point lighthouse and is surrounded by a 170-acre area of undulating grassland and scrub owned by the National Trust and known as Knowles Farm.

The beach is composed predominantly of sandstone, chalk and chert boulders (which are around 90 to 110 million years old) which are rich in fossils.

The name of the bay may have come from that of a sloop lost there in 1755. The bay was home to a boathouse from the mid 19th century to early 20th century.

References

Bays of the Isle of Wight